Yuke's Co. Ltd. is a Japanese video game developer based in Osaka. It was established on 26 February 1993 by Yukinori Taniguchi. The company is best known for developing the WWE video game series, based on the professional wrestling promotion of the same name, until 2018.

History
Founded in 1993, Yuke's was named after founder Yukinori Taniguchi's high school nickname. The first two games that the company developed were the platform game Hermie Hopperhead and the pro wrestling game Toukon Retsuden. The latter title was a best-seller in Japan. Though Activision purchased the rights to publish the game in North America and began localization work, only the first game was localized, becoming Power Move Pro Wrestling with a different roster of wrestlers.

Beginning in 2000, Yuke's began to develop wrestling games for THQ based on the World Wrestling Federation (WWF; now WWE). They were recommended to THQ by Aki, who had developed their own line of wrestling games.

From 2005 to 2012, Yuke's owned 54% of New Japan Pro-Wrestling, the top professional wrestling promotion in Japan.

In August 2019, then-series publisher 2K Games announced it had moved WWE game development to California-based studio Visual Concepts. Earlier that year, Yuke's had revealed its frustration over what it had been able to achieve with recent WWE 2K games and suggested that its relationship with publisher 2K Sports was partly responsible. Producer Hiromi Furuta revealed that Yuke's had established a new development team tasked with creating a rival wrestling IP, with the intention of reinvigorating its staff. On November 10, 2020, All Elite Wrestling (AEW) announced an upcoming console game developed by Yuke's, led by Def Jam Vendetta and WWF No Mercy director, Hideyuki "Geta" Iwashita.

Games developed
These are the list of games that the company developed.

References

External links

Video game companies established in 1993
Video game companies of Japan
New Japan Pro-Wrestling
Video game development companies
Japanese companies established in 1993
Companies based in Osaka Prefecture